Bratsk Reservoir (Bratskoye Reservoir) is a reservoir on the Angara River, located in the Lena-Angara Plateau of Irkutsk Oblast, Russia. It is named after the city of Bratsk, the largest city adjacent to the reservoir.

The concrete dam of the Bratsk hydroelectric plant was completed in 1967. The Baikal Amur Mainline railroad runs along the top of the dam. Its electrical power capacity is 4,500 MW. To this day, it is classified as the second biggest dam in the world by reservoir storage capacity. 

Bratsk Reservoir is multi-purpose, and used in an integrated way for hydropower, water transport, water supply, forestry, fisheries and recreation. There are 25 different kinds of fish in the reservoir, 10 are suitable for commercial purposes. The quality of the water has been classified as ranging from category 2 'clean', to category 5 'dirty', for a number of factors. Drinking water is sourced from the 'clean' zones.

In literature
The epic construction of the Bratsk Dam  is the subject of a long eponymous poem by Yevgeny Yevtushenko.
Much later (1976), the impact of the reservoir construction on the life of the villagers upstream, many of whom had to be relocated from the flooded areas, or lost some the best lands of their collective farms, became the motive of Valentin Rasputin's novel Farewell to Matyora.

References

External links 
 Description and photo

Reservoirs built in the Soviet Union
Reservoirs in Russia
Reservoirs in Irkutsk Oblast